Shawn Lemon (born August 25, 1988) is a Canadian football defensive lineman for the BC Lions of the Canadian Football League (CFL). He played college football at the University of Akron and attended Westlake High School in Waldorf, Maryland. He has also been a member of seven CFL teams (Winnipeg Blue Bombers, Saskatchewan Roughriders, Eskimos / Elks, Ottawa Redblacks, Toronto Argonauts, Calgary Stampeders), three arena football teams (San Jose SaberCats, Orlando Predators, Sioux Falls Storm) and two NFL teams (Pittsburgh Steelers, San Francisco 49ers).

Early years
Lemon was born on August 25, 1988, in Charleston, South Carolina. His family moved to Waldorf Maryland and he participated in football, basketball and track and field for the Westlake High School Wolverines. He broke the single-season at Westlake and the Southern Maryland Athletic Conference record with 21 sacks. Lemon recorded 97 tackles as a senior and was named first team All-Metro. He was also named to the Maryland Big School All-State second team. He accrued 80 tackles, 16 sacks, and two interceptions as a junior in 2004, being named second team All-Metro.

College career
Lemon played college football for the Akron Zips of the University of Akron. He was an All-Mid-American Conference selection as a senior, leading the team with seven sacks and four fumble recoveries. He ended his college career with 102 tackles, 23 tackles for loss, 11 sacks, five fumble recoveries and six forced fumbles.

Professional career

Winnipeg Blue Bombers
On July 18, 2011, Lemon was signed to the practice roster of the Winnipeg Blue Bombers of the CFL. He was released by the Blue Bombers on July 21, 2011.

Saskatchewan Roughriders
Lemon signed with the CFL's Saskatchewan Roughriders on August 10, 2011. He made his CFL debut on September 11, 2011 against the Winnipeg Blue Bombers. He was released by the Roughriders on September 21, 2011.

San Jose SaberCats
Lemon was assigned to the San Jose SaberCats of the Arena Football League (AFL) on March 11, 2012.

Orlando Predators
Lemon was traded to the Orlando Predators on April 18, 2012. He was reassigned by the Predators on May 8, 2012.

Sioux Falls Storm
Lemon signed with the Sioux Falls Storm of the Indoor Football League after his release from the Predators.

Edmonton Eskimos
Lemon spent the 2012 season with the (then named) Edmonton Eskimos of the CFL. He was released by Edmonton on May 22, 2013.

Calgary Stampeders
Lemon signed with the Calgary Stampeders of the CFL on June 2, 2013. He played six games in 2013, recording 18 tackles, three quarterback sacks and a fumble recovery. He was on the reserve list for twelve games. Lemon recorded six tackles in the Western Final. He started all 18 games for the Stampeders in 2014, recording 13 sacks, five tackles for a loss and eight forced fumbles (CFL League Record) . He also totaled 31 tackles, a special-teams tackle and an interception. Lemon was named the Defensive Player of the Week for Week 15 when he recorded three tackles, a pair of sacks and a forced fumble in a victory over the Saskatchewan Roughriders. The Stampeders won the 102nd Grey Cup against the Hamilton Tiger-Cats on November 30, 2014. On January 19, 2015, the Stampeders released Lemon, allowing him to become a free-agent and pursue employment opportunities in the NFL.

Pittsburgh Steelers
Lemon agreed to a contract with the Pittsburgh Steelers of the National Football League (NFL) on January 20, 2015. He was released by the Steelers on August 3, 2015.

San Francisco 49ers
Lemon was signed by the NFL's San Francisco 49ers on August 8, 2015. He was released by the 49ers on August 31, 2015. He was listed as a linebacker during his time with the Steelers and 49ers.

Ottawa Redblacks
On September 3, 2015, Lemon signed with the Ottawa Redblacks of the CFL. He is expected to start at defensive end for Ottawa. Lemon played in the last half of the season with the Redblacks, contributing five quarterback sacks during the regular season. He was released by the Redblacks on December 4 so he could pursue NFL opportunities.

Saskatchewan Roughriders (II)
Lemon was signed by the Saskatchewan Roughriders on January 15, 2016. Lemon was listed as the third-string defensive end for opening night, effectively confirming rumours that Lemon was unhappy with the Roughriders coaching staff. Following a week 1 defeat Lemon asked to be traded.

Toronto Argonauts
After reports that Lemon was not happy in Saskatchewan, Lemon was traded to the Toronto Argonauts on July 2, 2016, after playing limited reps in only one game for the Roughriders. Lemon and a conditional 2018 CFL Draft pick were sent to the Argonauts in exchange for Mitchell Gale and Matt Sewell. Lemon played in 16 games for the Argos during the 2016 season and finished tied for second in the CFL with 14 sacks. He was recognized by his peers for his performance and was named a CFL East Division All-Star. On December 1, 2016 Lemon and the Argos agreed on a contract extension which will keep him with the 'double-blue' through the 2018 CFL season. Lemon was hampered by injury during 2017, and was the only starter on Toronto's defensive line not to make the CFL East All Stars list (Victor Butler, Dylan Wynn, and Cleyon Laing all made the list), but Lemon still managed 8 sacks and a forced fumble in 12 games played. During the playoffs, Lemon recorded 3 sacks in a victory over the Saskatchewan Roughriders. Lemon and the Argos would go on to defeat Lemon's former team, the Stampeders to win the 105th Grey Cup. Lemon played in 5 games for Toronto in 2018, before being traded away. In those games he made 5 tackles, one sack, and one forced fumble.

BC Lions
On July 24, 2018, Lemon was traded to the BC Lions for a negotiation list player. Lemon formed a formidable pass rush tandem with Odell Willis, and went on to record 10 sacks in 13 games for BC, including two against Toronto in two meetings later that season.

Toronto Argonauts (II)
After becoming a free agent in February 2019, Lemon signed with Toronto again on a one-year contract. Lemon played in four games for the Argos in 2019, contributing 15 tackles and one quarterback sack.

BC Lions (II) 
On August 12, 2019, for the second time in his career, Lemon was traded from Toronto to the BC Lions in the middle of the season, this time for Davon Coleman. Lemon's first game back with the Lions saw him create 2 sacks and force a fumble, while also inflicting a season ending injury upon Winnipeg quarterback Matt Nichols. Lemon recorded 8 sacks in 10 games with the Lions. Lemon was not re-signed by the Lions following the 2019 season and became a free agent on February 11, 2020.

Edmonton Elks (II) 
On February 3, 2021, Lemon signed a one-year deal with the Edmonton Football Team (since re-named the Elks). However, he was released near the end of training camp on July 29, 2021.

Calgary Stampeders (II)
On July 30, 2021, it was announced that Lemon had signed with the Calgary Stampeders. Lemon continued his stellar play in the 2021 and 2022 seasons playing in 28 games for the Stamps, and posting 55 defensive tackles, 22 quarterback sacks, and seven forced fumbles. He was named a CFL All-Star following the 2022 season, his first such honour. He was also named the winner of the Norm Fieldgate Trophy, which is awarded to the most outstanding defensive player in the West Division. Following the season Lemon was not re-signed by the Stampeders and became a free agent on February 14, 2023.

BC Lions (III) 
On February 26, 2023, it was announced that Lemon had signed again with the BC Lions.

Career statistics

References

External links
BC Lions bio
NFL Draft Scout
 

1988 births
Living people
African-American players of American football
African-American players of Canadian football
Akron Zips football players
American football defensive linemen
American football linebackers
Calgary Stampeders players
Canadian football defensive linemen
Edmonton Elks players
Orlando Predators players
Ottawa Redblacks players
People from Waldorf, Maryland
Pittsburgh Steelers players
Players of American football from Maryland
Players of American football from South Carolina
San Francisco 49ers players
San Jose SaberCats players
Saskatchewan Roughriders players
Sioux Falls Storm players
Sportspeople from Charleston, South Carolina
Sportspeople from the Washington metropolitan area
Toronto Argonauts players
BC Lions players
21st-century African-American sportspeople
20th-century African-American people